Wayne Erwin Capers (born May 17, 1961 in Miami, Florida) is a former professional American football player who played wide receiver for four seasons for the Pittsburgh Steelers and Indianapolis Colts. Prior to his professional career Capers was an All-Big Eight receiver at the University of Kansas. Caper's wife, the former Robbin Smith, played in 82 games for the Kansas women's basketball team from 1979–80 through 1981–82. Robbin attended Pittsburgh's Schenley High School and majored in: communication studies. Caper's son, Wayne Capers Jr. played in 14 games for the University of Arizona in 2012 and 2013 and transferred to Duquesne University in the spring of 2014.

References

1961 births
Living people
Players of American football from Miami
American football wide receivers
Kansas Jayhawks football players
Pittsburgh Steelers players
Indianapolis Colts players